The Church of St. Nicholas is a medieval Serbian Orthodox church located in Baljevac na Ibru, near Raška, Serbia. It is dated to the 12th or the beginning of 13th century.

References

13th-century Serbian Orthodox church buildings
Raška District
Cultural Monuments of Great Importance (Serbia)

sr:Crkva Svetog Nikole u Baljevcu